Fulton County Charter High School of Mathematics and Science, also known as Math/Science High and MSH, was a high school in Roswell, Georgia, United States, established in 2001 and disbanded in the spring of 2004. Housed in an old furniture store, the charter school was built around New York City's Bronx High School of Science model.

History

Only one student completed high school at MSHS, Gabriel Kassel. His degree was granted from another area high school, but all coursework was completed at the end of the Junior (third year) of the school's operation.

The building was subsequently leased and remodeled by the Atlanta Academy, a private K-8 elementary school in 2006. The Atlanta Academy remains in the facility, as of 2016.

Enrollment
Enrollment was open to all high school students in Fulton County.

Awards
Website Design competition, 3rd place
All-state Band (2001), 2 students
Georgia Tech's Robojackets competition (Spring 2002), 5th place
Odyssey of the Mind, regional (2004), 1st place
Odyssey of the Mind, state (2004), 2nd place
Georgia Science and Engineering Fair, state (2004), 1st place

Clubs and Sports teams 
Art Club
Basketball Team
Baseball Team
Chess Club
Fellowship of Christian Athletes
Golf Team
Hockey Team
Computer Club
Newspaper
Odyssey of the Mind
Ping-Pong Club
Robotics Team
String Ensemble
Tennis Team
Volley Ball Team
Video Game Club
Yearbook

References

Roswell, Georgia
Former high schools in Georgia (U.S. state)
Schools in Fulton County, Georgia